Amivantamab, sold under the brand name Rybrevant, is a bispecific monoclonal antibody used to treat non-small cell lung cancer. Amivantamab is a bispecific epidermal growth factor (EGF) receptor-directed and mesenchymal–epithelial transition (MET) receptor-directed antibody. It is the first treatment for adults with non-small cell lung cancer whose tumors have specific types of genetic mutations: epidermal growth factor receptor (EGFR) exon 20 insertion mutations.

The most common side effects include rash, infusion-related reactions, skin infections around the fingernails or toenails, muscle and joint pain, shortness of breath, nausea, fatigue, swelling in the lower legs or hands or face, sores in the mouth, cough, constipation, vomiting and changes in certain blood tests.

Amivantamab was approved for medical use in the United States in May 2021, and in the European Union in December 2021. The U.S. Food and Drug Administration considers it to be a first-in-class medication.

Medical uses 
Amivantamab is indicated for the treatment of adults with locally advanced or metastatic non-small cell lung cancer (NSCLC) with epidermal growth factor receptor (EGFR) exon 20 insertion mutations, as detected by an FDA-approved test, whose disease has progressed on or after platinum-based chemotherapy.

History 
The U.S. Food and Drug Administration (FDA) approved amivantamab based on CHRYSALIS, a multicenter, non-randomized, open label, multicohort clinical trial (NCT02609776) which included participants with locally advanced or metastatic non-small cell lung cancer (NSCLC) with EGFR exon 20 insertion mutations. Efficacy was evaluated in 81 participants with advanced NSCLC with EGFR exon 20 insertion mutations whose disease had progressed on or after platinum-based chemotherapy. In the published study, the overall response rate was 40%, with a median duration of response of 11.1 months, and a median progression-free survival of 8.3 months (95% CI, 6.5 to 10.9).

The FDA collaborated on the review of amivantamab with the Brazilian Health Regulatory Agency (ANVISA) and the United Kingdom's Medicines and Healthcare products Regulatory Agency (MHRA). The application reviews are ongoing at the other regulatory agencies.

Society and culture

Legal status 
Amivantamab was approved for medical use in the United States in May 2021. On 14 October 2021, the Committee for Medicinal Products for Human Use (CHMP) of the European Medicines Agency (EMA) adopted a positive opinion, recommending the granting of a conditional marketing authorization for the medicinal product Rybrevant, intended for the treatment of non-small cell lung cancer (NSCLC) with activating epidermal growth factor receptor (EGFR) exon 20 insertion mutations. The applicant for this medicinal product is Janssen-Cilag International N.V. Amivantamab was approved for medical use in the European Union in December 2021.

Names 
Amivantamab is the recommended international nonproprietary name (INN).

Research 
Amivantamab is being investigated in combination with lazertinib versus osimertinib; and in combination with carboplatin-pemetrexed chemotherapy compared to carboplatin-pemetrexed.

References

Further reading

External links 
 
 

Breakthrough therapy
Monoclonal antibodies for tumors